Armagnac may refer to:

 Armagnac (province), a region of France
 Armagnac (brandy), a type of brandy
 Armagnac (party), a prominent French political party during the Hundred Years' War
 House of Armagnac, a French noble house
 Count of Armagnac
 Armagnac battalion, a resistance group in Toulouse organized by George Reginald Starr in advance of the Normandy invasion
 SNCASE Armagnac, a large French airliner of the late 1940s